Anna Coutsoudis (born 21 September 1952) is a South African public health scientist and academic who has conducted research on HIV and nutrition, specializing in the benefits of breastfeeding. An elected member of the Academy of Science of South Africa, she is a founder member and chair of iThemba Lethu, an organization for children with HIV, which provides a community-based breast milk bank.

Biography
Coutsoudis received her BSc from the University of Natal in 1974, followed by a Higher Diploma in Education in 1975. Later, while raising a family, she completed her studies at the same university, earning a PhD from the Department of Paediatrics and Child Health with a thesis titled Epidemiological and clinical studies of vitamin A in Black South African pre-school children.

She was honoured by an award from La Leche League International in 2001 for stressing the benefits of breastfeeding while in 2004 her extensive work on nutrition research was recognized by the Nutrition Society of South Africa.

In Mexico at the International AIDS Society Conference in 2008, Coutsoudis presented a convincing and well-received paper which stressed the benefits of breastfeeding for HIV-affected infants. The following year,  an article she and her colleague Hoosen Coovadia published in The Lancet called on the South African government to stop providing free formula milk to HIV-infected mothers, causing outrage from HIV activists. In particular, Cousoudis criticized the commercial promotion of formula milk for young babies in South Africa, especially as it countered recommendations from the World Health Organization. In September 2016, Coutsoudis participated in the International Atomic Energy Agency's 60th conference in Vienna where she was a key speaker at a well-attended event on "Nuclear Techniques to Assess Breastfeeding Practices".

Coutsoudis has served on various committees of the World Health Organization including the Steering Committee of the Child and Adolescent Health Unit and guideline development groups on Vitamin A Supplementation and HIV and Infant Feeding. She has published over 100 peer-reviewed scientific articles.

Awards and honors
In 2009, Anna Coutsoudis was awarded the Science for Society Gold Medal by the Academy of Science of South Africa.

References

External links 

South African women scientists
Living people
South African public health doctors
Members of the Academy of Science of South Africa
University of Natal alumni
Academic staff of the University of KwaZulu-Natal
1952 births
Women public health doctors